Siberian Uvaly is a hilly region in the central part of the West Siberian Plain, Russia. 

A  sector of the hills is a protected area under the name Upper Taz Nature Reserve, which was established in December 1986. The area is sparsely populated. Only a few settlements, such as Beloyarsky town, are located in the Siberian Uvaly.

Geography
The hilly area falls within the Khanty-Mansi and Yamalo-Nenets Autonomous Okrugs of Tyumen Oblast. It extends roughly from west to east between the Ob and the basin of the Yeloguy river, a tributary of the Yenisei. The Central Ob Lowland (Средне-Обская низменность) stretches to the south and the Nadym and Taz lowlands to the north. The Uvaly form a drainage divide between the right tributaries of the Ob and the upper course of the Kazym, Nadym, Pur and Taz river basins. 

The word "Uval" refers to an elongated hill with a flat, slightly convex or wavy top and gentle slopes. The hills are low and have a smooth profile and include waterlogged basins in between, such as the central part, which is the lowest, having an almost flat relief.

Hydrograpy
Numerous rivers have their source in the area, such as the Vatinsky Yogan, Tromyogan, Poluy, Amnya, Pim, Kolikyogan and Lyamin of the Ob basin, the Yerkalnadeypur and Ayvasedapur of the Pur basin, as well as the Tolka of the Taz basin. Some of the flat areas of the Siberian Uvaly have numerous, mostly small, thermokarst lakes, but there are also some large ones, such as Numto.

Flora
In the western and eastern sections of the Siberian Uvaly, spruce, larch, and pine taiga predominates. In the lower central part, there is sparse larch taiga interspersed with swamps.

See also
List of mountains and hills of Russia

References

External links
Sibirskie Uvaly - iNaturalist
ЗАПОВЕДНИК «ВЕРХНЕ-ТАЗОВСКИЙ»
Glaciation of Western Siberia in the Siberian System of natural ice

West Siberian Plain
Landforms of Khanty-Mansi Autonomous Okrug
Landforms of Yamalo-Nenets Autonomous Okrug